Lake Francis is a natural lake in South Dakota, in the United States.

Lake Francis was named for the child of a first settler.

See also
List of lakes in South Dakota

References

Lakes of South Dakota
Lakes of Deuel County, South Dakota